Schismus barbatus is a species of grass known as common Mediterranean grass and kelch-grass. It is native to Eurasia, and it is also known as an introduced species in the southwestern United States. It grows in many habitats, including disturbed areas. It is an annual grass growing in small clumps. The stems grow up to 27 centimeters long and are lined with threadlike leaves. The short inflorescence bears spikelets under a centimeter long.

References

External links
Jepson Manual Treatment
Grass Manual Treatment
Photo gallery

Danthonioideae